Andreas Speer (born  in ) is a German philosopher and professor. Since 2004 he is the director of the Thomas-Institut at the University of Cologne.

Books

Written

Edited
Die Bibliotheca Amploniana: Ihre Bedeutung im Spannungsfeld von Aristotelismus, Nominalismus und Humanismus (Walter de Gruyter, 1995)
Raum und Raumvorstellungen im Mittelalter (Walter de Gruyter, 1998, with Jan A. Aersten)
Was ist Philosophie im Mittelalter? (Walter de Gruyter, 1999, with Jan A. Aersten)

References

External links
Official page at the Thomas-Institut (in German) 

Academic staff of the University of Cologne
1957 births
Living people
People from Düsseldorf